Dehydrogenase/reductase SDR family member 1, also known as Short chain dehydrogenase/reductase family 19C member 1 is an enzyme that in humans is encoded by the DHRS1 gene located on chromosome 14.

Structure 
The DHRS1 gene is located on the chromosome 14q21.3 region and contains 9 exons. It encodes a 314-amino-acid, 33-kDa protein that is thought to be located to the endoplasmic reticulum and the mitochondrial inner membrane inside the cell.

Function 
The DHRS1 protein is thought to have oxidoreductase activity based on sequence similarity and conserved catalytic sites with other short-chain oxidoreductase enzymes. The enzyme is found to be expressed in the fetal brain.

Interactions 
The DHRS1 protein is thought to interact with the protein phospholipid scrambase 1 (PLSCR1).

References

Further reading

Genes
Human proteins